Rajeev Ram and Joe Salisbury defeated the defending champion Bruno Soares and his partner Jamie Murray in the final, 3–6, 6–2, 6–2 to win the men's doubles tennis title at the 2021 US Open. It was the second major title for Ram and Salisbury as a team, following the 2020 Australian Open. Ram and Salisbury saved four match points en route to the title, in the quarterfinals against Matthew Ebden and Max Purcell.

Soares and Mate Pavić were the defending champions, but did not play together. Pavić partnered Nikola Mektić, but lost in the first round to Nathaniel Lammons and Jackson Withrow. 

Salisbury also won the mixed doubles title partnering Desirae Krawczyk, becoming the first man to win both the men's doubles and mixed doubles titles at the US Open in the same year since Bob Bryan in 2010.

Seeds

Draw

Finals

Top half

Section 1

Section 2

Bottom half

Section 3

Section 4

Other entry information

Wild card entries

Alternates

Withdrawals
Before the tournament
  Nikoloz Basilashvili /  Andrei Vasilevski → replaced by  Kwon Soon-woo /  Divij Sharan
  Aljaž Bedene /  Laslo Đere → replaced by  Laslo Đere /  Filip Krajinović
  Alexander Bublik /  David Vega Hernández → replaced by  Frederik Nielsen /  Vasek Pospisil
  James Duckworth /  Yoshihito Nishioka → replaced by  James Duckworth /  Jordan Thompson
  Jürgen Melzer /  Jo-Wilfried Tsonga → replaced by  Jürgen Melzer /  Marc Polmans

See also 
2021 US Open – Day-by-day summaries

References

External links
 Draw

Men's Doubles
US Open - Men's Doubles
US Open (tennis) by year – Men's doubles